Muirhead may refer to:

People
 Muirhead (surname)
 Muirhead Bone (1876–1953), Scottish artist
 Muirhead Collins (1852-1927),  English-born Royal Navy officer, colonial Australian naval officer and public servant, and Australian federationist

Places
 Muirhead, Angus, a village near Dundee, Scotland
 Muirhead, Fife, a location in Scotland
 Muirhead, New Jersey, an unincorporated community in the USA
 Muirhead, North Lanarkshire, a village near Chryston, Scotland
 Muirhead, Northern Territory, a suburb of Darwin, Australia
 Muirhead, South Ayrshire, a location in Scotland
 7818 Muirhead (1990 QO), an asteroid

See also
 Head of Muir, a small village near Falkirk, Scotland
 Muirhead's inequality in mathematics, named after Robert Franklin Muirhead
 Muirhead Library of Philosophy, a series of philosophical publications named after J H Muirhead
 Moorehead, a surname
 Reddingmuirhead, a small village near Falkirk, Scotland